Ciemne  is a village in the administrative district of Gmina Radzymin, within Wołomin County, Masovian Voivodeship, in east-central Poland.

The village has an approximate population of 760.

References

Ciemne